The Protocol for the Suppression of Unlawful Acts against the Safety of Fixed Platforms Located on the Continental Shelf (SUA PROT) is a multilateral treaty by which states agree to prohibit and punish behaviour which may threaten the safety of offshore fixed platforms, including oil platforms.

Content
The Protocol was concluded at the same time as the Convention for the Suppression of Unlawful Acts against the Safety of Maritime Navigation (SUA Convention) and like it is based on the Convention for the Suppression of Unlawful Seizure of Aircraft.

The Protocol criminalises the following behaviour:
Seizing control of a fixed platform by force or threat of force;
committing an act of violence against a person on a fixed platform if it is likely to endanger the safety of the platform;
destroying a fixed platform or damaging it in such a way that endangers its safety;
placing or causing to be placed on a fixed platform a device or substance which is likely to destroy or cause damage to the ship or its cargo;
injuring or killing anyone while committing 1–4;
attempting any of 1–5;
being an accomplice to any of 1–6; and
compelling another through threats to commit any of 1–7.

The Protocol sets out the principle of aut dedere aut judicare—that a state party to the treaty must either (1) prosecute a person who commits one of the offences or (2) send the individual to another state that requests his or her extradition for prosecution of the same crime.

Creation and entry into force
The Protocol was adopted by the International Conference on the Suppression of Unlawful Acts against the Safety of Maritime Navigation at Rome on 10 March 1988. Formally, it is a Protocol that is supplementary to the SUA Convention and could not have come into force before the SUA Convention. It came into force on 1 March 1992 on the same date that the SUA Convention came into force.

State parties
As of November 2018, the Convention has 156 state parties, which includes 155 UN member states plus Niue.

The following are the 38 UN member states that are not party to the Convention. An asterisk beside the state indicates that the state is not a landlocked country and thus has maritime coastline.

Of these 38 states, Iraq has signed the Protocol.

2005 Protocol
In London on 14 October 2005, a supplementary Protocol to SUA PROT was concluded. The full name of the 2005 Protocol is the Protocol of 2005 to the Protocol for the Suppression of Unlawful Acts against the Safety of Fixed Platforms Located on the Continental Shelf and is often abbreviated as "SUA PROT 2005". The 2005 Protocol adds provisions which criminalises the use of fixed platforms to discharge biological, chemical, or nuclear weapons. It also prohibits ships from discharging oil, liquefied natural gas, radioactive materials, or other hazardous or noxious substances in quantities or concentrations that are likely to cause death or serious injury or damage. It also prohibits the use of such weapons or substances against fixed platforms.

The Protocol came into force on 28 July 2010 and as of February 2016 has been ratified by 35 states.

External links
Text
Signatures and ratifications
Text, incorporating the 2005 Protocol 

Admiralty law treaties
Terrorism treaties
Protocol for the Suppression of Unlawful Acts against the Safety of Fixed Platforms Located on the Continental Shelf
1988 in Italy
Treaties concluded in 1988
Treaties entered into force in 1992
Treaties of the Afghan Transitional Administration
Treaties of Albania
Treaties of Algeria
Treaties of Andorra
Treaties of Antigua and Barbuda
Treaties of Argentina
Treaties of Armenia
Treaties of Australia
Treaties of Austria
Treaties of Azerbaijan
Treaties of the Bahamas
Treaties of Bahrain
Treaties of Bangladesh
Treaties of Barbados
Treaties of Belarus
Treaties of Belgium
Treaties of Benin
Treaties of Bolivia
Treaties of Bosnia and Herzegovina
Treaties of Botswana
Treaties of Brazil
Treaties of Brunei
Treaties of Bulgaria
Treaties of Burkina Faso
Treaties of Cambodia
Treaties of Canada
Treaties of Cape Verde
Treaties of Chile
Treaties of the People's Republic of China
Treaties of the Comoros
Treaties of the Republic of the Congo
Treaties of Costa Rica
Treaties of Ivory Coast
Treaties of Croatia
Treaties of Cuba
Treaties of Cyprus
Treaties of the Czech Republic
Treaties of Denmark
Treaties of Djibouti
Treaties of Dominica
Treaties of the Dominican Republic
Treaties of Ecuador
Treaties of Egypt
Treaties of El Salvador
Treaties of Equatorial Guinea
Treaties of Estonia
Treaties of Fiji
Treaties of Finland
Treaties of France
Treaties of Georgia (country)
Treaties of Germany
Treaties of East Germany
Treaties of Ghana
Treaties of Greece
Treaties of Grenada
Treaties of Guatemala
Treaties of Guinea
Treaties of Guinea-Bissau
Treaties of Guyana
Treaties of Honduras
Treaties of Hungary
Treaties of Iceland
Treaties of India
Treaties of Iran
Treaties of Ireland
Treaties of Israel
Treaties of Italy
Treaties of Jamaica
Treaties of Japan
Treaties of Jordan
Treaties of Kazakhstan
Treaties of Kenya
Treaties of Kiribati
Treaties of Kuwait
Treaties of Laos
Treaties of Latvia
Treaties of Lebanon
Treaties of Lesotho
Treaties of Liberia
Treaties of the Libyan Arab Jamahiriya
Treaties of Liechtenstein
Treaties of Lithuania
Treaties of Luxembourg
Treaties of Madagascar
Treaties of Malawi
Treaties of the Maldives
Treaties of Mali
Treaties of Malta
Treaties of the Marshall Islands
Treaties of Mauritania
Treaties of Mauritius
Treaties of Mexico
Treaties of Moldova
Treaties of Monaco
Treaties of Mongolia
Treaties of Montenegro
Treaties of Morocco
Treaties of Mozambique
Treaties of Myanmar
Treaties of Namibia
Treaties of Nauru
Treaties of the Netherlands
Treaties of New Zealand
Treaties of Nicaragua
Treaties of Niger
Treaties of Nigeria
Treaties of Niue
Treaties of Norway
Treaties of Oman
Treaties of Pakistan
Treaties of Palau
Treaties of Panama
Treaties of Paraguay
Treaties of Peru
Treaties of the Philippines
Treaties of Poland
Treaties of Portugal
Treaties of Qatar
Treaties of South Korea
Treaties of Romania
Treaties of Russia
Treaties of San Marino
Treaties of São Tomé and Príncipe
Treaties of Saudi Arabia
Treaties of Senegal
Treaties of Serbia and Montenegro
Treaties of Seychelles
Treaties of Slovakia
Treaties of Slovenia
Treaties of South Africa
Treaties of Spain
Treaties of Saint Lucia
Treaties of Saint Vincent and the Grenadines
Treaties of Singapore
Treaties of the Republic of the Sudan (1985–2011)
Treaties of Eswatini
Treaties of Sweden
Treaties of Switzerland
Treaties of Syria
Treaties of Tajikistan
Treaties of Tanzania
Treaties of North Macedonia
Treaties of Togo
Treaties of Tonga
Treaties of Trinidad and Tobago
Treaties of Tunisia
Treaties of Turkey
Treaties of Turkmenistan
Treaties of Ukraine
Treaties of the United Arab Emirates
Treaties of the United Kingdom
Treaties of the United States
Treaties of Uruguay
Treaties of Uzbekistan
Treaties of Vanuatu
Treaties of Vietnam
Treaties of Yemen
Treaties of Yugoslavia
International Maritime Organization treaties
Treaties extended to the Isle of Man
Treaties extended to Aruba
Treaties extended to the Caribbean Netherlands
Treaties extended to Hong Kong
Treaties extended to Jersey